Upendranath College is located in Soro, Balasore district, Odisha, India. The college was founded in 1964. It is located near NH-5. The Higher Secondary courses are affiliated to Council of Higher Secondary Education, Odisha  and Graduation courses are affiliated to Fakir Mohan University. Arts Degree started in 1966, Commerce in 1978 and Science in 1980.

References

External links 
 

Universities and colleges in Odisha
Education in Balasore district
Educational institutions established in 1964
1964 establishments in Orissa